Greycrook is a village off the A68 and the A699 in the Scottish Borders, approximately  south-east of St Boswells, and close to Dryburgh, Dryburgh Abbey, Maxton, Newtown St Boswells, and the River Tweed.

It was here that the highest temperature in Scotland, was recorded on 9 August 2003.

References

See also
Climate of Scotland
United Kingdom weather records
List of places in the Scottish Borders
List of places in Scotland

Villages in the Scottish Borders
Eildon